TPMS may refer to:

 Takoma Park Middle School, in Maryland, US
 Tire-pressure monitoring system
 Transaction Processing Management System, ICL computer software
 Triply periodic minimal surface, an aspect of differential geometry